Sarah Harrison may refer to:

Sarah Harrison (journalist) (born 1981/82), British journalist, legal researcher, and WikiLeaks section editor
Sarah Harrison (novelist) (born 1946), English novelist
Sarah Harrison (singer) (born 1990), British/Maltese artist, DJ, producer, and musician
Sarah Ann Harrison (1837–?), photographer in Malta
Sarah Cecilia Harrison (1863–1941), Irish artist and Dublin City Council member
Sarah Harrison Blair (née Harrison), wife of Virginia clergyman James Blair

See also
 Sarah Harris (disambiguation)